The 2015 PSL Grand Prix was the second indoor conference of the Philippine Super Liga for its third season. The conference began on October 10, 2015, at the Alonte Sports Arena, in Biñan, Laguna.

Stav Jacobi, FIVB Executive Council member and chief organizer of the FIVB World Women's Club Volleyball Championship, was the guest of honor for the opening ceremony, while Prajaya Chaiyakam, the deputy managing director of SMMTV, Asian Volleyball Confederation (AVC)'s official TV partner, and his cameraman went to Cuneta Astrodome to witness Game 1 of the PSL Finals.

The tournament champion, the Foton Tornadoes, will represent the country in the 2016 AVC Women's Club Championship.

There was no tournament for the men's division this conference.

Video challenge system
The PSL became the third Southeast Asia-based volleyball club league (after Thailand and Vietnam) to utilize the video challenge system allowing teams to challenge and decide crucial calls during the games for a fair and balanced officiating, as part of the full compliance to the FIVB rules. The system, reportedly worth ₱3 million, courtesy of Italy-based Data Volley (composed of machine and 26 high-definition cameras to be beamed through a giant LED screen provided by Sports5 inside the venue) arrived on October 26, 2015 and used on October 27, 2015, during the second round of the tournament. Emmanuel Celle of the Data Volley spearheaded the project.

The video challenge was officially launched two days later with Cignal's coach Sammy Acaylar being the first to use the video challenge system, block touch during first set of their match against Foton. The system was available for the games held within the venues in Metro Manila and in the Spike on Tour event in Imus, Cavite.

Teams

Women's division

Classification round

|}

|}

Final round

Semi-finals

|}

5th place

|}

3rd place

|}

Finals

Final standing

Individual awards

Skill set leaders

Venues

Metro Manila venues
Cuneta Astrodome (main venue)
Filoil Flying V Arena (secondary venue)

PSL Spike on Tour venues
 Alonte Sports Arena (October 10 - opening day)
 Malolos Sports and Convention Center (November 7)
 De La Salle Lipa Sentrum (November 14)
 Imus City Sports Center (November 21)

Broadcast partners
 TV5, AksyonTV, Sports5.ph 
 Solar Sports

Broadcast Notes:

Additional Game 3 crew:

Awards Presenter: Anthony Suntay

References

Philippine Super Liga
PSL
PSL